Gary Wayne Hall (born May 22, 1939) is a Canadian retired professional ice hockey winger who played four games in the National Hockey League for the New York Rangers in December 1960, before being returned to the Kitchener Beavers.

Career 
The Rangers signed Hall as a free agent in 1957. He also played for a number a minor league hockey teams during his career, including the junior league Flin Flon Bombers (1956–59), Trois-Rivières Lions (1959–60), Vancouver Canuck, and Seattle Totems, among others. After playing his last season with the Buffalo Bisons, he retired from hockey in 1969.

References

External links

1939 births
Living people
Canadian ice hockey left wingers
Ice hockey people from Manitoba
New York Rangers players